ITIM was a news agency established in 1950 in Tel Aviv, by journalist Hayim Baltsan (1910- 2002) חיים בלצן . Israel.

History
ITIM was founded in 1950 by Baltsan and the seven main Israeli newspapers of the time, who each held an equal stake in the agency. Founder and executive director for the first 25 years was leading Israeli journalist Hayim Baltsan (1910 - 2002)/ The agency went into receivership in November 2003 and nearly ceased operations due to massive debts. On 19 February 2004, it was bought by an Israeli company for US$75,000. The agency now specialises in providing reports to foreign news agencies such as Germany's Deutsche Presse-Agentur and the Federal News Agency based in Washington, D.C., United States.
 The agency was closed in 2006.

References

1950 establishments in Israel
News agencies based in Israel